Henry Paget, 4th Marquess of Anglesey and 5th Earl of Uxbridge  (25 December 1835 – 13 October 1898) was a British peer.  He served as Vice-Admiral of the Coast, North Wales and Carmarthenshire, and was the Honorary Colonel of the 2nd Volunteer Battalion, Royal Welch Fusiliers.

Background
Anglesey was the second son of Henry Paget, 2nd Marquess of Anglesey, by his second wife Henrietta Bagot, fourth daughter of Charles Bagot. On 30 January 1880 he succeeded to the titles of 5th Earl of Uxbridge, co. Middlesex, 7th Baronet Bayly of Plas Newydd, Anglesey and Mount Bagenall, and 13th Lord Paget, of Beaudesert (Staffordshire). He owned a large part of the County of Anglesey.

He married firstly Elizabeth Norman, secondly Blanche Mary Boyd and thirdly from 1880 an American heiress, Mary "Minna" Livingston King, the widow of Hon. Henry Wodehouse.

References

1835 births
1898 deaths
Henry
Royal Welch Fusiliers officers
4